Marie Guillaume Gerard Joseph Schreurs (18 November 1934 – 10 April 2022) was a Dutch Roman Catholic priest and politician. A member of the Christian Democratic Appeal, he served in the Senate from 1980 to 1981. He died in Sittard-Geleen on 10 April 2022 at the age of 87.

References

1934 births
2022 deaths
Dutch Roman Catholic priests
Christian Democratic Appeal politicians
Members of the Senate (Netherlands)
People from Nuth